The Gun River is a  tributary of the Kalamazoo River in Michigan, in the United States.  It begins at the outlet of Gun Lake at the border between Allegan and Barry counties and flows southwest through Allegan County to its mouth at the Kalamazoo River just east of Otsego.

See also
List of rivers of Michigan

References

Michigan  Streamflow Data from the USGS

Rivers of Michigan
Rivers of Allegan County, Michigan
Rivers of Barry County, Michigan
Tributaries of Lake Michigan